Part Sixteen (Part XVI) of the Constitution of Albania is the Sixteenth of eighteen parts. Titled Extraordinary Measures, it consists of 7 articles.

Extraordinary Measures

References

16